Vendela Elin Birgitta Zachrisson-Santén  (née Zachrisson; born 11 June 1978 in Göteborg) is a Swedish competitive sailor and Olympic medalist. She won a bronze medal in the 470 class at the 2004 Summer Olympics in Athens, together with Therese Torgersson.

References

External links
 
 
 
 

1978 births
Living people
Sportspeople from Gothenburg
Swedish female sailors (sport)
Sailors at the 2004 Summer Olympics – 470
Sailors at the 2008 Summer Olympics – 470
Olympic sailors of Sweden
Olympic bronze medalists for Sweden
Olympic medalists in sailing
Medalists at the 2004 Summer Olympics
470 class world champions
World champions in sailing for Sweden